Shepard Glacier is a glacier remnant (glacieret) In Glacier National Park in the U.S. state of Montana. The glacieret is immediately southeast of Cathedral Peak. Shepard Glacier was one of a number of glaciers that have been documented by the United States Geological Service (USGS) to have retreated significantly in Glacier National Park. Between 1966 and 2005, Shepard Glacier lost 56 percent of its surface area.  
 
Comparing the 2005 image at right to the one below taken in 1913, it is apparent that Shepard glacier has retreated significantly between these dates.

See also
List of glaciers in the United States
Glaciers in Glacier National Park (U.S.)

References

Glaciers of Glacier County, Montana
Glaciers of Glacier National Park (U.S.)
Glaciers of Montana